The Jahant AVA is an American Viticultural Area located within the Lodi AVA.  Most of the AVA is located within San Joaquin County, California, with a small part in Sacramento County.  At , Jahant is the smallest of the Lodi sub-appellations.  The area is known for its distinctive pink colored Rocklin-Jahant loam soil with the AVA's boundaries being delineated by the extent and reaches of the soil. This low-lying AVA is affected by its close proximity to the Mokelumne River and the Sacramento-San Joaquin River Delta which keeps the climate cool and dry.

References 

American Viticultural Areas of California
Geography of Sacramento County, California
American Viticultural Areas
Geography of San Joaquin County, California
2006 establishments in California